{{DISPLAYTITLE:5-Fluoro-5-deoxy-D-ribose 1-phosphate}}

5-Fluoro-5-deoxy--ribose 1-phosphate is metabolite formed during the biosynthesis of organofluorides. It is formed by the purine nucleoside phosphorylase mediated phosphorolytic cleavage of 5'-deoxy-5'-fluoroadenosine. It is isomerized to 5-fluoro-5-deoxy-ribulose-1-phosphate which is then cleaved by an aldolase to release fluoroacetaldehyde.

References

Organofluorides
Organophosphates
Halogen-containing natural products
Fluorine-containing natural products